Salticinae is a subfamily of jumping spiders (family Salticidae). It includes over 90% of the known species of jumping spiders. The subfamily is divided into two unranked clades: Amycoida and Salticoida.

Description
Members of the subfamily Salticinae have a number of features in common that distinguish them from the remaining salticids. Females lack a tarsal claw on the pedipalp. The palpal bulb of male basal salticids has a distinctive median apophysis, which is absent in the subfamily, and the cymbium is constricted at the tibial joint. Members also have a more complex tracheal system, which may be connected with their movements, which are more abrupt than other salticids, giving them a recognizable gait.

Taxonomy

Phylogeny
The relationships among the basal salticids are not yet fully resolved; summary cladograms published in both 2014 and 2015 show unresolved branching for five basal subfamilies. However, Hisponinae is resolved as sister to Salticinae, which is the most derived subfamily.

Classification
In 2015, Wayne Maddison divided the subfamily into 27 tribes with a total of about 540 extant genera. The tribes were grouped into a number of clades.

Subfamily Salticinae
clade Amycoida – 9 tribes
clade Salticoida – 18 tribes in total, most grouped into 3 subclades:
basal – 2 tribes
Astioida – 5 tribes
Marpissoida – 3 tribes
Saltafresia – 8 tribes

References

Salticidae
Spider subfamilies